Matthew Smith (b. c. 1665; d. before 1723?) was a 17th-century spy and the author of Memoirs of Secret Service, which was published in London in 1699.

Smith was educated at Adams Grammar School at the same time as the Jacobite conspirator Robert Charnock. He was the nephew of Sir William Parkyns who first employed him as spy. He later worked in the service of the Earl of Monmouth during the reign of William III and implicated the Duke of Shrewsbury in a letter to Monmouth. The allegation in the letter being that Duke, one of William III's ministers had been aware of a Jacobite plot to assassinate the King. The Earl used this information in an attempt to ruin the Duke, this however backfired and caused the Earl to spend a short while in the Tower of London. As a result of these allegations, Smith was taken from his lodgings in London and interviewed at the House of Lords.

Memoirs of Secret Service is seen as the prototype of the literary genre of spy autobiographies and there is some controversy as to whether Smith wrote the book or whether his school friend and author Tom Brown did.

References

1660s births
English spies
Year of death unknown
People educated at Adams' Grammar School
17th-century spies